Aish is a hamlet in the English county of Devon, near the village of Stoke Gabriel.

Aish House is a Grade II listed 19th century house on the south side of Aish Road. 

There is also a hamlet just outside South Brent with the same name.

Villages in South Hams